Frosting on the Beater is the third album by American rock band The Posies, released in 1993. It featured a darker sound than the band's prior works, in part due to production duties being handled by Don Fleming. "Dream All Day", "Solar Sister" and "Definite Door" were released as singles, with the first two getting moderate airplay and the third being the band's only single to break the UK top 75. Frosting on the Beater was the last album original drummer Mike Musburger appeared on.

"Flavor of the Month" was a swipe at the many overnight-sensation grunge bands in The Posies' hometown of Seattle. "Coming Right Along" appeared on the soundtrack to the movie The Basketball Diaries (1995, Island Records). "Dream All Day" was later used as the title of the band's best-of compilation, released in 2000. The Posies later remade "Flavor of the Month" with brand-new lyrics as "Voyage of the Aquanauts" for the series Bill Nye the Science Guy.

Track listing

Personnel
Credits adapted from discogs
The Posies
 Jon Auer – guitar, vocals, bass, vibraphone 
 Ken Stringfellow – guitar, vocals, bass, organ, piano
 Dave Fox – bass 
 Mike Musburger – drums
Production
Don Fleming - producer
Stephen Marcussen - mastering
David Bianco - mixing (tracks: 1-3, 5, 6, 8-12)
Adam Kasper, Jim Waters, Jon Auer - engineer
Jamie Seyberth, Mark Guilbeault - assistant engineer , mixing
Fred Kevorkian - assistant engineer 
Artwork and Design
Kevin Reagan - Art Direction, Design 
Dennis Keeley - Photography

References

1993 albums
The Posies albums
albums produced by Don Fleming (musician)
Geffen Records albums